Walter Pollard (26 September 1906 – 26 July 1945) was an English professional footballer who played as an inside forward. Pollard died from a heart attack, aged 38, in 1945.

References

External links

1906 births
1945 deaths
Footballers from Burnley
English footballers
Association football inside forwards
Burnley F.C. players
West Ham United F.C. players
FC Sochaux-Montbéliard players
Fulham F.C. players
Southampton F.C. players
Brighton & Hove Albion F.C. players
Tunbridge Wells F.C. players
English Football League players
Ligue 1 players
English expatriate footballers
Expatriate footballers in France